Emmy Award for Best Television Documentary may refer to the following Emmy Awards:
 News & Documentary Emmy Award
 Primetime Emmy Award for Outstanding Documentary or Nonfiction Series
 Primetime Emmy Award for Outstanding Documentary or Nonfiction Special
 International Emmy Award for Best Documentary

Emmy Awards